Michael Anthony Williams (born May 18, 1987) is a former American football wide receiver. He played college football at Syracuse, and was drafted by the Tampa Bay Buccaneers in the fourth round of the 2010 NFL Draft. He has also played for the Buffalo Bills and the Kansas City Chiefs.

Early years
Williams attended Riverside Institute of Technology. As a senior, he had 970 receiving yards and 15 touchdowns on offense and 35 tackles and two interceptions on defense.

College career
As a true freshman at Syracuse in 2006, Williams made 24 receptions for a team-leading 461 yards and four touchdowns in 10 games. As a sophomore in 2007 Williams was an all-Big East second-team selection. He finished the season tying a school record with 60 receptions for 837 yards and ten touchdowns in 12 games.

In June 2008 Williams was suspended for the 2008 season for academic reasons.

On November 3, 2009, Williams quit the team due to a possible suspension following a violation of team rules after he was involved in a car accident with teammates, Antwon Bailey, Andrew Tiller and Torrey Ball. In 2009 before he quit the team he had impressive numbers including 49 receptions for 746 yards and six touchdowns in only 7 games.

Professional career

Tampa Bay Buccaneers

2010 season

Williams was drafted by the Tampa Bay Buccaneers in the fourth round (101st overall) in the 2010 NFL Draft. He was signed to a four-year contract on June 4, 2010.

On September 12, 2010, he made his NFL debut against the Cleveland Browns, making 5 receptions for 30 yards and a touchdown. In his first pro season, Williams became the first Buccaneer rookie to score a touchdown in back-to-back games since Carnell Williams in 2005. On October 31, 2010, Williams recorded first career 100-yard receiving game at Arizona, finishing with 105 yards on four receptions and a touchdown.

Williams started all 16 games as a rookie and had 65 receptions for 964 yards and 11 touchdowns. His 11 touchdowns marked a new Buccaneers franchise record for most receiving touchdowns in a single season. After his great rookie season, Williams finished second in voting for AP Offensive Rookie of the Year, and was a finalist for the NFL Pepsi Rookie of the Year. He was also named to The Sporting News NFL All- Rookie Team and PFW/PFWA All-Rookie Team and led all rookie receivers in the NFL in yardage (964), receptions (65) and touchdowns (11) in 2010.

2011 season
In 2011, Williams took a step back as his receiving yards and touchdowns went down. He was still an effective starter as he caught 68 passes for 771 yards.

2012 season
He finished the 2012 season with a career-high in receiving yards with 996.

2013 season
On July 24, 2013 it was reported that Williams had agreed to a new six-year, $40.25 million contract with the Buccaneers that would have kept him in Tampa Bay through the 2018 season. On October 28, the Bucs announced that they had placed Williams on injured reserve, ending his season and leaving the Buccaneers without one of their starting wideouts the rest of the way. Williams battled a hamstring injury for several weeks and finished the season with 22 catches for 216 yards and two touchdowns.

Buffalo Bills
On April 4, 2014, Williams was traded to the Buffalo Bills, his hometown team, for a 6th-round draft pick, just one season after signing a contract extension with the Buccaneers. On October 13, 2014, it was reported that Williams had asked the Bills for a trade. Williams was placed on the waived/injured list on December 8, 2014. He went unclaimed during the waiver process, and was placed on the Bills injured reserve list the next day.  On December 22, 2014, Williams recovered from his calf injury and was released by the Bills.

Suspension
On September 8, 2015, it was announced that Williams would be suspended for the first six weeks of the 2015 season. He spent the entire 2015 season as a free agent.

Kansas City Chiefs
On April 25, 2016, Williams signed with the Kansas City Chiefs. On August 25, 2016, Williams was released by the Chiefs.

References

External links
 Buffalo Bills bio 
 Tampa Bay Buccaneers bio 
 Syracuse Orange bio 

1987 births
Living people
Players of American football from Buffalo, New York
American football wide receivers
Syracuse Orange football players
Tampa Bay Buccaneers players
Buffalo Bills players
Kansas City Chiefs players